Euryachora is a genus of fungi in the family Mycosphaerellaceae.

Species
Euryachora arjonae
Euryachora castanopsidis
Euryachora epilobii
Euryachora indica
Euryachora maculiformis
Euryachora neowashingtoniae
Euryachora paeoniae
Euryachora rhytismoides
Euryachora sacchari
Euryachora sedi
Euryachora syzygii

References

Mycosphaerellaceae genera
Ascomycota genera
Taxa described in 1870
Taxa named by Karl Wilhelm Gottlieb Leopold Fuckel